Cyril William North Raymond MBE (13 February 1899 – 20 March 1973) was a British character actor. He maintained a stage and screen career from his teens until his retirement, caused by ill health, in the 1960s.

His many stage, film and television roles include Fred Jesson, the husband of Celia Johnson's Laura Jesson in Brief Encounter (1945).

Life and career 
Raymond was the son of Herbert Linton Raymond and his second wife, Rose ( Knowles). Herbert died in 1906 at the Grand Hotel, Broad Street, Bristol, which he and his wife ran. 

Raymond became a pupil at Sir Herbert Tree's Academy of Dramatic Art. He made his professional debut in 1914 at the Garrick Theatre, London, playing the Second Spanish Gentleman in Bluff King Hal. 

As Little Billee in Trilby he supported Tree's Svengali at His Majesty's Theatre in 1915. While still a boy actor he appeared in plays by Louis N. Parker, Edward Knoblock and Harold Brighouse. In 1916, he played a major juvenile role, Lord Deerford, in Parker's Disraeli. The Observer reported that he "played very cleverly". A film was made of the play; he repeated his role of Deerford.

In 1922 Raymond married the actress Iris Hoey. They had one child, John Raymond, who became an author and critic. The couple co-starred in several West End plays in the 1920s; Raymond also worked extensively with the producer Basil Dean. He and Hoey divorced in 1936 and the following year he married the actress Gillian Lind.

In the view of Raymond's obituarist in The Times it was in the mid-1930s that "he found what might be called his vocation, in contributing balanced, controlled, humorous pieces of acting as foils to more flamboyant performances by highly accomplished leading ladies". 

He co-starred as the spouse or partner of a range of leading ladies over the next twenty or so years, including Sybil Thorndike in Short Story (1935), Ruth Chatterton in The Constant Wife (1937 revival), Gertrude Lawrence in September Tide (1948), Edith Evans in Waters of the Moon (1953) and Yvonne Arnaud in Mrs Willie (1956).

During the Second World War Raymond served in the Royal Air Force from 1939 to 1945, and was awarded the MBE. In the cinema he appeared as Celia Johnson's character's husband in the 1945 film Brief Encounter. In The Observer, C. A. Lejeune praised "the sweetness, the sobriety, and the fresh delicacy" of his performance and those of Johnson and Trevor Howard.

In the 1960s, Raymond appeared in plays by writers of the younger generation, including Nigel Dennis, Giles Cooper and John Osborne. In Osborne's Inadmissible Evidence in 1965 he appeared with Nicol Williamson and John Hurt. This was one of his last appearances, and ill health obliged him to retire several years before his death.

Filmography (incomplete) 

 The Hypocrites (1916) – Leonard Wilmore
 Disraeli (1916) – Lord Deeford
 I Will (1919) – Harris Giles
 His Last Defence (1919) – David Hislop
 The Scarlet Kiss (1920)
 Wuthering Heights (1920) – Hareton
 Sonia (1921) – Tom Dainton
 Single Life (1921) – John Henty
 Moth and Rust (1921) – Fred Black
 Cocaine (1922)
 The Faithful Heart (1922) – Albert Oughterson
 These Charming People (1931) – Miles Winter
 The Ghost Train (1931) – Richard Winthrop
 The Happy Ending (1931) – Anthony Fenwick
 A Man of Mayfair (1931) – Charles
 Condemned to Death (1932) – Jim Wrench
 The Frightened Lady (1932) – Sergeant Ferraby
 The Shadow (1933) – Jim Silverton
 The Lure (1933) – Paul Dane
 Strike It Rich (1933) – Slaughter
 The Man Outside (1933) – Captain Fordyce
 Mixed Doubles (1933) – Reggie Irving
 Home, Sweet Home (1933) – John Falkirk
 Keep It Quiet (1934) – Jack
 Royal Cavalcade (1935) – Undetermined Minor Role (uncredited)
 The Tunnel (1935) – Harriman
 It's Love Again (1936) – Montague
 Tomorrow We Live (1936) – George Warner
 Accused (1936) – Guy Henry
 Thunder in the City (1937) – James
 Dreaming Lips (1937) – PC
 Stardust (1938) – Jerry Sears
 Night Alone (1938) – Tommy
 The Spy in Black (1939) – The Rev. John Harris
 Goodbye, Mr. Chips (1939) – Teacher (uncredited)
 Come On George! (1939) – Jimmy Taylor
 Saloon Bar (1940) – Harry Small
 The First of the Few (1942) – Radio Control Officer (uncredited)
 Brief Encounter (1945) – Fred Jesson
 Men of Two Worlds (1946) – Education Officer
 This Was a Woman (1948) – Austin Penrose
 Quartet (1948) – Railway Passenger (segment "The Colonel's Lady")
 The Jack of Diamonds (1949, co-wrote screenplay with Nigel Patrick) – Roger Keen
 Angels One Five (1952) – Squadron Leader Barry Clinton
 Rough Shoot (1953) – Cartwright
 The Heart of the Matter (1953) – Carter (uncredited)
 The Gay Dog (1954) – Rev. Gowland
 The Crowded Day (1954) – Philip Stanton
 One Just Man (1954)
 Lease of Life (1954) – The Headmaster
 Charley Moon (1956) – Bill
 The Baby and the Battleship (1956) – P.M.O.
 The Safecracker (1958) – Inspector Frankham
 Dunkirk (1958) – General The Viscount Gort V.C.
 No Kidding (1960) – Col. Matthews
 Carry On Regardless (1961) – Army Officer
 Don't Talk to Strange Men (1962) – Mr. Painter
 Night Train to Paris (1964) – Insp. Fleming

Selected stage credits
 Summertime by Louis N. Parker (1919)
 The Last Hour by Charles Bennett (1928)
 The Return of the Soldier by John Van Druten (1928)
 There's Always Juliet by John Van Druten (1931)
 Tony Draws a Horse by Lesley Storm (1939)
 Under the Counter by Arthur Macrae (1945)
 Happy with Either by Margaret Kennedy (1948)
 Aunt Edwina by William Douglas Home (1959)

Notes, references and sources

Notes

References

Sources

External links 
 

1899 births
1973 deaths
20th-century English male actors
English male film actors
English male silent film actors
English male stage actors
Members of the Order of the British Empire
Royal Air Force officers
Royal Air Force personnel of World War II